The North Troy–Highwater Border Crossing connects the town of Highwater, Quebec with North Troy, Vermont on the Canada–US border.  It is located at the meeting point of Vermont Route 243 and Quebec Route 243.  Both stations are open 24 hours per day for non-commercial traffic; the Canadian station is open to commercial traffic on weekdays during business hours.  The former US station facilities, dating to the 1930s, are listed on the National Register of Historic Places.

Setting
This border crossing, one mile east of the Portland-Montreal Pipe Line, is in a rural setting on the east–west border between Vermont and Quebec, roughly midway between the village center of North Troy, and the crossroads village of Highwater.  Route 243 runs in a roughly northwest–southeast direction between the two communities, roughly paralleling the course of the Missisquoi River.  Both border stations are located a short distance from the actual border.

Canadian station
Canada first established a Customs operations for this crossing in 1844, when it opened an office four miles north in the town of Potton.  In 1933, the office was moved to its present location at the border.  The US border station was constructed shortly thereafter.  Canada rebuilt its station in 1966.

United States station

The United States station was built in 2009, replacing a facility built in 1937. It was the first formal border station built on this site, as part of a program by the United States government to improve border security due to increases in the use the automobile for travel, illegal immigration, and smuggling occasioned by Prohibition.

See also
 List of Canada–United States border crossings
 National Register of Historic Places listings in Orleans County, Vermont

References

Canada–United States border crossings
Geography of Estrie
Government buildings on the National Register of Historic Places in Vermont
National Register of Historic Places in Orleans County, Vermont
1844 establishments in Canada
1844 establishments in Vermont